Thamnolia tundrae is a species of lichen in the family Icmadophilaceae. Its distribution covers the arctic tundra of Eurasia and extends to the North American Aleutian Islands. It was formally described as a new species in 2018 by Ioana Brännström and Leif Tibell. The type specimen was collected from Täljstensvalen mountain (Jämtland, Sweden). Its thallus features white, hollow, cylindrical tufts, which are morphologically the same as the other members of genus Thamnolia. Thamnolia tundrae, however, is phylogenetically distinct from these other similar species. Secondary compounds found in the lichen include baeomycesic acid and squamatic acid. The species is suspected to have survived the latest glaciation in coastal refugia in regions close to its current range.

References

Pertusariales
Lichen species
Lichens described in 2018
Lichens of Asia
Lichens of Europe
Taxa named by Leif Tibell
Lichens of the Arctic